Jeremy "Spike" Cohen (born June 28, 1982) is an American libertarian political activist, entrepreneur, and podcaster. He was the Libertarian Party's nominee for vice president of the United States in 2020, serving as Jo Jorgensen's running mate.

Early life 
Cohen was born in Baltimore, Maryland, in 1982. Cohen's father is Jewish, and he was raised as a Messianic Jew, including having a Bar Mitzvah.

He purports to have chosen the nickname "Spike" at the age of 3, after the character from the 1986 children's film My Little Pony: The Movie.

Career
In 1998, at the age of 16, Cohen began learning web design and subsequently started a profitable business within a few years. In 2016, after being  diagnosed with multiple sclerosis, Cohen sold his web design business and turned his focus to libertarian activism.

In 2017, Cohen retired from web design to focus on Libertarian messaging, entertainment, and activism. This culminated with him becoming the co-owner of, and a podcaster on, Muddied Waters Media. He is the co-host of The Muddied Waters of Freedom, and the host of My Fellow Americans.

2020 vice presidential campaign 

Cohen ran as the proposed running mate of presidential candidate Vermin Supreme in the 2020 Libertarian presidential primaries, and was actively involved in campaigning.

On May 23, 2020, Supreme lost the Libertarian presidential nomination to Jo Jorgensen, but Cohen remained in the race for the party's vice presidential nomination. Jorgensen showed a preference for John Monds to be her running mate over Cohen and Ken Armstrong, but despite this, after three rounds of voting, Cohen defeated Monds with 533 delegate votes to Monds' 472. As the Libertarian Party's vice presidential nominee, Cohen became the first Jewish vice presidential nominee of a political party since Joe Lieberman in 2000.

Political positions 

Cohen has asserted that his and Jorgensen's platform was derived from the Libertarian Party platform. This includes reducing the national debt by reducing the size of government, extensive criminal justice reform and the immediate release of those incarcerated for victimless crimes, demilitarization of the police and the creation of police accountability programs.

Cohen supports presidential pardons for Julian Assange, Chelsea Manning, Edward Snowden, Ross Ulbricht, and Leonard Peltier.

Cohen, a former ally of performance artist and perennial candidate Vermin Supreme, ran during his vice presidential primary campaign on a largely satirical platform promoting free ponies, mandatory tooth brushing, "zombie power", killing "baby Hitler" and "baby Woodrow Wilson", and promoting anarchy. Cohen promised that should these not be achieved within the first 100 days of his vice presidency, he would resign and be replaced with Baby Yoda.

After officially receiving the Libertarian vice presidential nomination, Cohen acknowledged that such humor tactics were "all fun satire to bring people in", adding "(t)hen you hit them with the actual message. The actual Libertarian message of self-ownership and non-aggression and voluntary solutions and property rights, and so forth."

Personal life 
Cohen has been married to his wife, Tasha, since 2010. He lives in Myrtle Beach, South Carolina.

See also 
 Third party and independent candidates for the 2020 United States presidential election
 2020 Libertarian National Convention

References

External links 

 
 
 

1982 births
Living people
2020 United States vice-presidential candidates
Activists from South Carolina
American anarcho-capitalists
American libertarians
American podcasters
Businesspeople from South Carolina
Jewish American candidates for Vice President of the United States
Libertarian Party (United States) vice presidential nominees
Messianic Jews
Politicians from Baltimore
People from Myrtle Beach, South Carolina
People with multiple sclerosis
South Carolina Libertarians